Upstream stimulatory factor 2 is a protein that in humans is encoded by the USF2 gene.

Function 

This gene encodes a member of the basic helix-loop-helix leucine zipper family, and can function as a cellular transcription factor. The encoded protein can activate transcription through Pyridine-rich initiator (Inr) elements and E-box motifs. Two transcript variants encoding distinct isoforms have been identified for this gene.

Interactions 

USF2 has been shown to interact with USF1 (human gene), PPRC1 and BRCA1.

Regulation 

The USF2 gene is repressed by the microRNA miR-10a.

References

Further reading

External links